George Tani Field is a baseball stadium in Casper, Wyoming.  It was the home field of the Casper Ghosts of the Pioneer Baseball League until the Mike Lansing Field opened in 2002.  The stadium holds 4,462 spectators and opened in 1964.

References

External links
 Venue information
 Images for George Tani Field

Minor league baseball venues
Buildings and structures in Casper, Wyoming
Baseball venues in Wyoming
1964 establishments in Wyoming
Sports venues completed in 1964
Sports in Casper, Wyoming